Air Transport Services Group (ATSG) is an American aviation holding company which provides air cargo transportation and related services to domestic and foreign air carriers and other companies that outsource their air cargo lift requirements. ATSG, is the world's largest lessor of converted Boeing 767 freighter aircraft through its leasing division, Cargo Aircraft Management. Through its principal subsidiaries, including three airlines with separate and distinct U.S. FAA Part 121 Air Carrier certificates, ATSG provides aircraft leasing, air cargo lift, passenger ACMI and charter services, aircraft maintenance services and airport ground services. ATSG's subsidiaries include Cargo Aircraft Management; ABX Air; Air Transport International; Omni Air International, Airborne Global Solutions; Airborne Maintenance & Engineering Services, including its subsidiary, Pemco Conversions dba Pemco World Air Services; and LGSTX Services.

ATSG owns a 25 percent equity interest in West Atlantic.

In March 2016, ATSG announced an agreement to operate an air cargo network to serve Amazon.com customers in the United States including: the leasing of 20 Boeing 767 freighter aircraft by ATSG subsidiary Cargo Aircraft Management; the operation of the aircraft by ATSG airline, Air Transport International; and gateway and logistics services provided by LGSTX Services. The 20 leases will be for five to seven years and operations agreements are for five years. ATSG will also grant Amazon warrants to soon buy 9.99% and up to 19.9% over a five-year period of ATSG common shares.  May 2021, Amazon.com exercised ATSG warrants it holds to acquire 19.5% of their common shares, including a cash equity investment of $132 million.

In January 2017, ATSG announced it had acquired Tampa, Florida-based PEMCO World Air Services, a commercial aircraft maintenance, repair & overhaul provider and Boeing 737 passenger-to-freighter conversion house.

On October 2, 2018, ATSG announced that it had agreed to acquire Omni Air International LLC (Omni Air) based in Tulsa, Oklahoma.  Omni Air is a passenger ACMI and charter services provider with significant experience serving U.S. and allied foreign governments plus commercial customers. They are a leading provider of passenger airlift services to the U.S. Department of Defense (DoD) via the Civil Reserve Air Fleet (CRAF) program, and a worldwide provider of full-service passenger charter and ACMI services. Omni Air also carries passengers worldwide for a variety of private sector customers and government services firms. Omni Air, founded in 1993, is an FAR Part 121 certificated and IATA Operational Safety Audit registered airline.

In December 2018 it was announced that additional agreements to lease and operated ten additional Boeing 767s for Amazon.com Services, Inc., to extend leases for twenty 767 aircraft ATSG provides to Amazon and extend the operating agreement through which ATSG's airline operate those aircraft in the Amazon Network.

On February 24, 2020, CEO Joe Hete announced his retirement effective on May 7, 2020 after 40 years of service to ATSG and its subsidiary companies. On May 7, 2020, Joe Hete was elected as Chairman of the Board for ATSG and Rich Corrado was elected CEO and President of ATSG.

In June, 2020, Air Transport Services Group, Inc. has deployed a Boeing 767-300 converted freighter in June in support of the DHL Express network in Asia under the terms of a stand-alone ACMI agreement with DHL-Bahrain.

December 2020, ATSG is named to the Forbes Best Small Companies List for 2020.

May 2021, ATSG and GA Telesis announced a joint venture that will establish an engine hospital facility in the United States.

Subsidiaries 
Cargo Aircraft Management – aircraft and engine leasing division
Airborne Global Solutions
Air Transport International – Cargo and Passenger airline
ABX Air – Cargo airline
Omni Air International – Passenger ACMI & Charter Airline
Airborne Maintenance & Engineering Services – Maintenance, Repair & Overhaul (MRO)
PEMCO Conversions – Boeing 737 and Airbus A321 Passenger to Freighter Conversion
LGSTX Services – Airport Support Services Company
TriFactor Distribution Solutions – Material Handling Design, Engineering, and Installation

References

External links 
 Corporate site

Airlines for America members
Companies based in Ohio
Clinton County, Ohio
Cargo airlines of the United States
Aircraft leasing companies
Boeing 767
Companies listed on the Nasdaq